Kahlil is an anglicized spelling of the Arabic masculine given name Khalil, famously used by Lebanese-American writer, poet and visual artist Kahlil Gibran (1883–1931; born Jubrān Khalīl Jubrān) in English after he was registered under that name by the Josiah Quincy School of Boston following his immigration to the United States.

Notable persons with the name Kahlil include:
 Kahlil Ashanti (born 1973), American actor and writer
 Kahlil Bell (born 1986), American football running back
 Kahlil Byrd, American political advisor and entrepreneur
 Kahlil Carter (born 1976),  American gridiron football coach
 Kahlil Cato (born 1977), Saint Vincent and the Grenadines sprinter
 Kahlil Dukes (born 1995), American basketball player
 Kahlil Felder (born 1995), American basketball player
 Kahlil Gibran (sculptor) (1922–2008), Lebanese-American painter and sculptor
 Kahlil Hill (born 1979), American gridiron football player
 Kahlil Joseph, American actor and teacher of performing arts
 Kahlil Joseph (filmmaker) (born 1981), American filmmaker, music video director, and video artist
 Kahlil Lewis (born 1997), American football wide receiver 
 Kahlil McKenzie (born 1997), American football guard
 Kahlil Whitney (born 2001), American basketball player 
 Kahlil Taylor  (born 1995)